The Vorpsi are an Albanian family native to Tirana and have their first records of a surname recorded in 1650 (Islam Vorpsi the first one to be recorded) by Ottoman registries in Tirana and the family's presence has been recorded since. A Muslim family in origin. Very well known, old and respected family from Tirana.

Notable family members include, Ornela Vorpsi (3 August 1968, Tirana), is an Albanian writer and photographer from the famous Vorpsi family in Tirana. Ornela studied at the Academy of Fine Arts of Brera in Milan, and has been living and working in Paris since 1997. In 2012 she was named one of the 35 best writers of Europe in Best European Fiction by Aleksander Hemon and Zadie Smith. Artiola Toska a famous Albanian singer today is also from this family. Ismail Kadare has mentioned the family name in his literature. The family also have roads with their surname in Tirana. Rruga Vorpset named after the family specifically.

Origins and History 
The Vorpsi family have been recorded in the villages of Tirana before it was established as a city in 1614 by Ottoman Albanian ruler Sulejman Bargjini. The Etymology of the surname is disputed but have a few theories. One being it comes from the Albanian word "Vorbull" which means whirlpool suggesting an origin in the pottery making business for the family, as the surname is said to have come from the word Vorb. Which would suggest its an occupational surname. Another theory is the surname descends from the word Vorbatine which is in reference to the Mountain of Vorbatines in north Albania and that is where the family has its ancient roots from. Most likely however to be related to the occupational surname theory. The surname during 1650 must've turned into a P replacing the previous B. The family turned Muslim during the late 1500s-early 1600s during the Islamization of Albania in the Ottoman Empire. The family were involved in  Albanian blood feuds and this led to one family member moving to Kosovo and another to Shkodra. Due to the family taking part in Kanun another theory of origin of the family is from Malesia but is not proven as of now. In the 1800s there was also an migration to Istanbul from a singular member of the family. In 1912 Ramazan Vorpsi killed 12 Serbian soldiers during the Balkan wars when Albania was being invaded by Serbia. He was ambushed and killed by Serbs in Lezhe.  He was fighting for the Albanian state to be independent and created.

References 

Albanian noble families